Bennie Maupin (born August 29, 1940) is an American jazz multireedist who performs on various saxophones, flute, and bass clarinet.

Maupin was born in Detroit, Michigan, United States. He is known for his participation in Herbie Hancock's Mwandishi sextet and Headhunters band, and for performing on Miles Davis's seminal fusion record, Bitches Brew. Maupin has collaborated with Horace Silver, Roy Haynes, Woody Shaw, Lee Morgan and many others. He is noted for having a harmonically-advanced, "out" improvisation style, while having a different sense of melodic direction than other "out" jazz musicians such as Eric Dolphy.

Maupin was a member of Almanac, a group with Cecil McBee (bass), Mike Nock (piano) and Eddie Marshall (drums).

Discography

As leader/co-leader 
 The Jewel in the Lotus (ECM, 1974)
 Almanac (Improvising Artists, 1977) with Mike Nock, Cecil McBee, Eddie Marshall – recorded in 1967
 Slow Traffic to the Right (Mercury, 1977)
 Moonscapes (Mercury, 1978)
 Driving While Black with Patrick Gleeson (Intuition, 1998)
 Penumbra (Cryptogramophone, 2006)
 Early Reflections (Cryptogramophone, 2008)
 Symphonic Tone Poem for Brother Yusef with Adam Rudolph (Strut, 2022)

As sideman
With John Beasley
 Positootly! (Resonance, 2009)

With Marion Brown
 Marion Brown Quartet (ESP-Disk, 1966)
 Juba-Lee (Fontana, 1967)
 Afternoon of a Georgia Faun (ECM, 1970)

With George Cables
 Shared Secrets (MuseFX, 2001)

With Mike Clark
 Actual Proof (Platform Recordings, 2000)

With Miles Davis
 Bitches Brew (Columbia, 1970)
 Jack Johnson (Columbia, 1971)
 On the Corner (Columbia, 1972)
 Big Fun (Columbia, 1974)

With Chick Corea
 Is (Solid State, 1969)
 Sundance (Groove Merchant, 1972) - recorded in 1969
 The Complete "Is" Sessions (Blue Note, 2002) - compilation

With Jack DeJohnette
 The DeJohnette Complex (Milestone, 1969) - recorded in 1968
 Have You Heard? (Milestone, 1970)

With Patrick Gleeson and Jim Lang
 Jazz Criminal (Electronic Musical Industries, 2007)

With Herbie Hancock
 Mwandishi (Warner Bros., 1971)
 Crossings (Warner Bros., 1972)
 Sextant (Columbia, 1973)
 Head Hunters (Columbia, 1973)
 Thrust (Columbia, 1974)
 Flood (CBS/Sony, 1975)
 Man-Child (Columbia, 1975)
 Secrets (Columbia, 1976)
 VSOP (Columbia, 1976)
 Sunlight (Columbia, 1978)
 Directstep (CBS/Sony, 1979)
 Feets, Don't Fail Me Now (Columbia, 1979)
 Mr. Hands (Columbia, 1980)
 Dis Is da Drum (Mercury, 1994)

With The Headhunters
 Survival of the Fittest (Arista, 1975)
 Straight from the Gate (Arista, 1977)
 Return of the Headhunters (Verve, 1998)

With Eddie Henderson
 Realization (Capricorn, 1973)
 Inside Out (Capricorn, 1974)
 Sunburst (Blue Note, 1975)
 Mahal (Capitol, 1978)

With Andrew Hill
  One for One (Blue Note, 1975) – recorded in 1965-70

With Lee Morgan
 Caramba! (Blue Note, 1968)
 Live at the Lighthouse (Blue Note, 1970)
 Taru (Blue Note, 1980) – recorded in 1968

With Darek Oleszkiewicz
 Like a Dream (Cryptogramophone, 2004)

With the Jimmy Owens-Kenny Barron Quintet
 You Had Better Listen (Atlantic, 1967)

With Woody Shaw
 Blackstone Legacy (Contemporary, 1970)
 Song of Songs (Contemporary, 1972)

With Horace Silver
Serenade to a Soul Sister (Blue Note, 1968)
You Gotta Take a Little Love (Blue Note, 1969)

With Lonnie Smith
 Turning Point (Blue Note, 1969)

With Jarosław Śmietana
 A Story of Polish Jazz (JSR, 2004)

With McCoy Tyner
 Tender Moments (Blue Note, 1968)
 Together (Milestone, 1978)

With Lenny White
 Big City (Nemperor, 1977)

With Meat Beat Manifesto
 Actual Sounds + Voices (Nothing, 1998)

References

1940 births
Living people
21st-century clarinetists
21st-century saxophonists
African-American jazz musicians
African-American saxophonists
American male saxophonists
American jazz flautists
American jazz saxophonists
American jazz bass clarinetists
Bass clarinetists
ECM Records artists
Jazz musicians from Michigan
American male jazz musicians
Mercury Records artists
Miles Davis
Musicians from Detroit
The Headhunters members
Almanac (band) members
Improvising Artists Records artists
21st-century flautists